Cyanothamnus westringioides is a species of erect shrub that is endemic to a small area in the southwest of Western Australia. It has simple, narrow, sessile leaves and pale pink flowers arranged singly in leaf axils.

Description
The stamens are glandular near the tip. Flowering occurs from July to October.

Taxonomy and naming
This species was first formally described in 1998 by Paul Wilson and given the name Boronia westringioides in the journal Nuytsia from a specimen collected near the road between Hyden and Norseman. In a 2013 paper in the journal Taxon, Marco Duretto and others changed the name to Cyanothamnus westringioides on the basis of cladistic analysis. The specific epithet (westringioides) refers to the similarity of this species to some in the genus Westringia.

Distribution and habitat
Cyanothamnus westringioides grows on loamy sandplains in a small area north of Lake King and east of Hyden.

Conservation
Cyanothamnus westringioides is classified as "Priority Two" by the Western Australian Government Department of Parks and Wildlife meaning that it is poorly known and from only one or a few locations.

References

westringioides
Flora of Western Australia
Plants described in 1998
Taxa named by Paul G. Wilson